Macarostola hieranthes is a moth of the family Gracillariidae. It is known from Sri Lanka.

The head of this species is white, the crown yellowish-tinged, collar pale crimson. Palpi pale crimson, terminal joint of labial yellowish-white.
Antennae white ochreous, basal joint yellowish-white.   Thorax crimson, posterior third white, abdomen grey.
Legs yellowish ringed with dark grey. Forewings crimson, markings pale yellow finally edged with blackish; a dot on costa near base.

References

Macarostola
Moths described in 1907